"Rover", also known as "Rover (Mu la la)", is a song by British rapper S1mba featuring British rapper DTG and produced by UK producer Relyt. The original single was released independently in November 2018 under Rax Productions, which S1mba is signed to. Rax Productions was founded by S1mba and manager Rapheal Adekunle. The song went viral on video-sharing app TikTok and was then re-released on the Rax Collective and the Parlophone (Warner) label in March 2019. Since then it achieved a UK BPI certified Platinum status with over 600,000 units. The song charted in many countries, including Australia, New Zealand, Greece, the Netherlands, Sweden, Denmark, and Ireland. At the 41st Brit Awards, the song received a nomination for Song of the Year, marking the first nomination for both artists.

Composition
In the song, S1mba claims he prefers making "mu la la" (meaning money) to the love of a girl. The title refers to S1mba's high-end Range Rover car. When girls see him in his car, they are all over him, but his love is "for the p's and pounds". S1mba explained the song portrays how life is, nobody wants to know when you are on the come up, nobody wants to know or take you in. However, as soon as you make it or do well for yourself, (in his case pulling up in a rover) people start to now notice you or show interest. It took a Range Rover for people to want to know more about him, but he is only focused on making more money as the lyrics state. Croydon YouTuber DTG has his own verse, with similar sentiments, as he says "I ain't got time for a honey", but has plenty of "time for this money".

Commercial performance
The song went viral on TikTok for the #mulachallenge that S1mba announced, associated with various dance moves and hand moves. The song climbed up the UK charts, reaching number three on the UK Singles Chart for the week ending 28 May 2019.

Charts

Weekly charts

Year-end charts

Certifications

References

2018 songs
2019 singles
S1mba songs
Parlophone singles